Clarence Sanders (born December 28, 1952) is a former American football linebacker. He played for the Kansas City Chiefs in 1978 and 1980.

References

1952 births
Living people
American football linebackers
Cincinnati Bearcats football players
Kansas City Chiefs players